The Phantom from 10,000 Leagues is a 1955 independently made, American, black-and-white, science-fiction monster film, produced by Jack Milner and Dan Milner (who also directed), that stars Kent Taylor and Cathy Downs.

The film's December release was as a double feature with Day the World Ended, American Releasing Corporation's first dual venture. ARC thereafter changed its name, becoming American International Pictures.

Plot
A mysterious, man-sized monster kills a fisherman at sea. Biologist Ted Baxter (Kent Taylor) and Federal Agent William Grant (Rodney Bell) discover the man's body, washed up on the beach and covered with radiation burns. They decide to investigate the strange death. After two young divers are killed by the monster, Ted and Grant decide to dive in the same location and investigate the area. They discover a glowing radioactive rock being guarded by the monster. Grant shoots it with a harpoon gun, allowing them to escape, but the creature survives.

Ted eventually discovers that Dr King (Michael Whalen), another marine biologist, created the monster and the radioactive rock with a mutating device in his laboratory. Meanwhile, foreign agents try to discover Dr King's secrets, while Ted and King's daughter Lois (Cathy Downs) develop a relationship.

Agent Grant captures the foreign agents after one of them kills King's secretary with a spear gun. Ted finally tells Dr King that the monster is killing people and that it must be stopped. When King witnesses a ship explode as it passes over the rock, he realizes Ted is right. He destroys his lab and goes out to the ocean to kill his creation using dynamite. Shortly before a timed detonation, the monster grabs Dr King while he is planting the underwater explosives. Ted, Grant, and Lois arrive just in time to witness the large explosion, which destroys the rock, the monster, and Dr King.

Cast

 Kent Taylor as Dr. Ted Stevens, alias Ted Baxter
 Cathy Downs as Lois King
 Michael Whalen as Professor King
 Phillip Pine as Agent George Thomas
 Rodney Bell as William Grant
 Vivi Janiss as Ethel Hall
 Helene Stanton as Spy Chief Wanda
 Michael Garth as Sheriff 
 Pierce Lyden as Andy the Janitor
 Norma Hanson as the Phantom

Production
When American Releasing Company began making low-budget films, they knew that if they made two together and released both as a double feature, they could make a larger profit. ARC's cofounder James H. Nicholson came up with the film's title, as he was looking for a feature to support and team with Day the World Ended. ARC lacked money to make both, so they allocated Phantom to Dan and Jack Milner, film editors who wanted to get into feature-film production. ARC and Milner split the costs 60/40.

Both films cost about $100,000 each to make.

As planned, The Phantom from 10,000 Leagues was theatrically released on a double bill alongside Day the World Ended. Both proved popular with audiences, due in part to savvy marketing by James H. Nicholson. In January 1956, the films were released simultaneously in 250 New England theaters grossing $45,000 from just 2 Boston theaters in its first week. Within two months of their release, both films had earned $400,000.

Home media

The film has been released on home media numerous times by different distributors over the years, either as a single or double feature, due to the film's entry into the public domain. It was last released on DVD by Film Detective on June 29, 2017. The movie is also available on several online platforms, including YouTube.

Reception

Author and film critic Leonard Maltin awarded the film his lowest rating of "BOMB". In his review, he wrote, "Lots of spy stuff and a lousy monster fail to enliven this deadly dull early American International effort".

See also
 List of films in the public domain in the United States
 Midnite Movies

References

Further reading
 Warren, Bill. Keep Watching the Skies: American Science Fiction Films of the Fifties, 21st Century Edition. Jefferson, North Carolina: McFarland & Company, 2009 (First Edition 1982). .

External links

 
 
 
 

1955 films
American black-and-white films
1950s science fiction horror films
1950s science fiction films
1955 horror films
1950s monster movies
Giant monster films
American independent films
American monster movies
Mad scientist films
Films scored by Ronald Stein
1950s English-language films
Films directed by Dan Milner
1950s American films